Events from the year 1905 in Canada.

Incumbents

Crown 
 Monarch – Edward VII

Federal government 
 Governor General – Albert Grey, 4th Earl Grey 
 Prime Minister – Wilfrid Laurier
 Chief Justice – Henri Elzéar Taschereau (Quebec)
 Parliament – 10th (from 11 January)

Provincial governments

Lieutenant governors 
Lieutenant Governor of Alberta – George Hedley Vicars Bulyea (from September 1) 
Lieutenant Governor of British Columbia – Henri-Gustave Joly de Lotbinière
Lieutenant Governor of Manitoba – Daniel Hunter McMillan
Lieutenant Governor of New Brunswick – Jabez Bunting Snowball 
Lieutenant Governor of Nova Scotia – Alfred Gilpin Jones 
Lieutenant Governor of Ontario – William Mortimer Clark 
Lieutenant Governor of Prince Edward Island – Donald Alexander MacKinnon 
Lieutenant Governor of Quebec – Louis-Amable Jetté 
Lieutenant Governor of Saskatchewan – Amédée Forget (from September 1)

Premiers 
Premier of Alberta – Alexander Cameron Rutherford (from September 2)
Premier of British Columbia – Richard McBride 
Premier of Manitoba – Rodmond Roblin 
Premier of New Brunswick – Lemuel John Tweedie
Premier of Nova Scotia – George Henry Murray 
Premier of Ontario – George William Ross (until February 8) then James Whitney
Premier of Prince Edward Island – Arthur Peters 
Premier of Quebec – Simon-Napoléon Parent (until March 24) then Lomer Gouin 
Premier of Saskatchewan – Thomas Walter Scott (from September 5)

Territorial governments

Commissioners 
 Commissioner of Yukon – Zachary Taylor Wood (acting) (until May 27) then William Wallace Burns McInnes 
 Commissioner of Northwest Territories – Frederick D. White (from August 24)

Lieutenant governors 
 Lieutenant Governor of Keewatin – Daniel Hunter McMillan (until September 1)
 Lieutenant Governor of the North-West Territories – Amédée E. Forget (until September 1)

Premiers 
 Premier of North-West Territories – Frederick Haultain (until September 1)

Events
 January 25 – 1905 Ontario election: Sir James Whitney's Conservatives win a majority, defeating G. W. Ross's Liberals
 February 8 – Sir James Whitney becomes premier of Ontario, replacing George Ross
 February 27 – Clifford Sifton resigns from cabinet
 March 23 – Lomer Gouin becomes premier of Quebec, replacing Simon-Napoléon Parent
 July 20 – The Saskatchewan Act and the Alberta Act receive royal assent
 August 26 – Roald Amundsen begins the first to travel through the Northwest Passage
 September 1 – Saskatchewan and Alberta are established as provinces
 September 2 – Alexander Rutherford becomes the first premier of Alberta
 September 5 – Walter Scott becomes the first premier of Saskatchewan
 November 9 – 1905 Alberta general election: Alexander Rutherford's Liberals win a majority in the first Alberta election
 November 24 – The Canadian Northern Railway is completed to Edmonton
 December 13 – 1905 Saskatchewan election: Walter Scott's Liberals win a majority in the first Saskatchewan election

Arts and literature

Births

January to June
 January 21 – George Laurence, nuclear physicist (d.1987)
 January 28 – Ellen Fairclough, politician and first female member of the Canadian Cabinet (d.2004)
 February 8 – Louis-Philippe Pigeon, judge of the Supreme Court of Canada (d.1986)
 March 27 – Elsie MacGill, the world's first female aircraft designer (d.1980)
 April 30 – John Peters Humphrey, legal scholar, jurist and human rights advocate (d.1995)
 May 1 – Paul Desruisseaux, lawyer and politician (d. 1982)
 May 23 – Donald Fleming, politician, International Monetary Fund official and lawyer (d.1986)
 June 8 – Ralph Steinhauer, native leader, first Aboriginal to become the Lieutenant Governor of Alberta (d.1987)
 June 23 – Jack Pickersgill, civil servant and politician (d.1997)

July to December
 July 25 – Grace MacInnis, politician and feminist (d.1991)
 August 1 – Helen Hogg-Priestley, astronomer (d.1993)
 August 31 – William Anderson, politician and businessman (d.1961)
 August 15 – E.K. Brown, literary critic
 September 21 – Loran Ellis Baker, politician (d.1991)
 November 1 – Paul-Émile Borduas, painter (d.1960)
 December 1 – Alex Wilson, track and field athlete and Olympic silver medallist (d.1994)
 December 24 – Milt Dunnell, sportswriter (d.2008)

Full date unknown
 Nat Taylor, inventor of the cineplex (d.2004)

Deaths
 April 23 – Gédéon Ouimet, politician and 2nd Premier of Quebec (b.1823)
 May 23 – Fletcher Bath Wade, politician and barrister (b.1852)
 May 29 – William McDougall, lawyer, politician and a Father of Confederation (b.1822)
 August 1 – John Brown, politician, miller, mining consultant and prospector (b.1841)
 August 7 – Alexander Melville Bell, educator (b.1819)
 September 8 – David Howard Harrison, farmer, physician, politician and 6th Premier of Manitoba (b.1843)
 October 29 – Étienne Desmarteau, athlete and Olympic gold medallist (b.1873)

Historical documents
Creation of provinces Saskatchewan and Alberta: details and Prime Minister Laurier's announcement

Call for Calgary to become Alberta capital

House of Commons committee chair has idea for local telephone services housed in post offices and provided and taxed by municipalities

Socialist Party brochure for Ontario election, with party platform

Mounties report to Ottawa on dance halls and prostitution in Dawson City, Yukon

McGill University principal addresses Canadian Club on role of university in commerce

Description of Peterborough Lift Lock on Trent Canal in Ontario

References 

 
Years of the 20th century in Canada
Canada
Canada